Johannes Minckwitz (21 January 1812 Lückersdorf – 29 December 1885 Neuenheim) was a German poet and classical scholar.

Biography
He was educated at Leipzig University, was appointed professor there in 1861, and in 1883 moved to Heidelberg University.

Work
He first gained fame by his translations into German of Homer, Aeschylus, Sophocles, Euripides, Aristophanes, Pindar, and Lucian. He also wrote Vorschule zum Homer ("Elementary Homer," 1863). In the field of German criticism, Minckwitz wrote Platen als Mensch und Dichter ("Platen, the person and the poet," 1836) and Leben Platens ("Life of Platen," 1838), and edited Platen's posthumous papers (1852); and he also published: Lehrbuch der deutschen Verskunst ("Textbook of German verse," 1844); a play, Der Prinzenraub ("Kidnapping of a prince," 1839); and a volume of popular poems (1847).

Family
He was the father of chess player and writer Johannes Minckwitz.

References

1812 births
1885 deaths
19th-century German poets
19th-century German male writers
19th-century German writers
German classical philologists
Translators of Ancient Greek texts
Translators to German
German literary critics
19th-century translators
Academic staff of Leipzig University
People from Kamenz